Víctor Larco Herrera also called commonly Víctor Larco is a district and a city of the north coast of Peru. It is located on a plain along the Pacific Ocean and is linked by a conurbation with Trujillo in La Libertad region. It is considered one of the 9 districts of the urban area known as Trujillo Metropolitano, one of the most populous metropolitan areas of Peru; it is also one of the 11 districts of Trujillo province. Victor Larco is the district that has the highest human development index (HDI) out of Lima Metropolitana, according to a study published by the United Nations Development Programme. In the early twentieth century, for its mild climate and fresh, it was known as Buenos Aires and then in 1945 got the name of Victor Larco Herrera in memory of the illustrious philanthropist Trujillan who was a benefactor of the city.

Today Víctor Larco is a commercial and residential urban center that still retains much of green areas and shopping areas like Larco avenue,  Fatima avenue, etc., Growing residential areas, educational centers at all levels that join students and teachers from around the country; also has tourist attractions like the Tunnel of  desires in the Water Walk, Santiago de Huamán church dating from the colonial era, the resort of Buenos Aires, the Paso Horse Mural, among others. Towards the south of the district still retains some of its countryside in the area near the Moche River and its mouth at the Pacific Ocean.

Identity elements
Víctor Larco has important traditions as marinera dance being Víctor El Chino Calderón an important exponent; training of paso horses that is performed mainly an Association of Breeders and Owners of Paso Horses.

Symbols
Coat of arms
Flag
Anthem
The anthem was written by Ramiro Mendoza Sánchez (lyrics) and music by Nelson Alfonso Asmat Vega. The municipality of the city sets the hymn mainly through official civic ceremonies held in the city with the interpretation thereof by bands of musicians. The hymn expresses greetings and appreciation to the city through its history.

Geography

Climate

Demographics
According to the results of the Population and Housing Census of 2007, the total population of Víctor Larco district for that year was 55 781 inhabitants, there being an urban population of 55,738 inhabitants and a rural population of 43 inhabitants. In 2012 the estimated population is of 61,845 inhabitants distributed mostly in urban areas of the district.

Religion
Currently in Victor Larco city the predominant religion is Christianity, as a religious custom of Spanish culture inherited from the colonial era. In this topic in the district there are different congregations who profess the Christian faith such as the Catholic Church, Jehovah's Witnesses, the Church of Jesus Christ of Latter-day Saints and also called Mormons, Pentecostal church, etc.. All these Christian congregations have their temples in different parts of the district and there are several churches of these congregations as the temple of the Church of the Latter-day Saints located on Avenida Larco, Catholic churches such as the Church of Huamán dating from colonial times and is located in the main square of the traditional village of Santiago de Huaman, etc. One of the most representative traditions of Christianity in Victor Larco and organized every year is the celebration of the patronal feast of the Lord of Huamán bringing together large numbers of Christians in the historic sanctuary of the traditional village of Huaman.

Transportation

Principal streets

Some of the most important streets in Víctor Larco district are:
Larco Avenue
This avenue takes its name of the famous trujillan politician Victor Larco Herrera; in this avenue are located many companies such as Cesar Vallejo University, RENIEC (Office for National Identity Register), etc.
Manuel Seoane avenue  this avenue goes to Buenos Aires beach.
Fátima avenue  in the limits with Trujillo district at north begins in Larco avenue.
El Golf avenue 
Dos de mayo avenue
César Vallejo avenue
Prolongación Juam Pablo II avenue 
Avenida Huamán, takes its name of the traditional and historic town of Huamán.
Los Paujiles avenue .

Education
Among the centers of higher education are the following:
Cesar Vallejo University.
TECSUP, is a technological institute.

Primary and secondary schools
Some of the primary and secondary schools are:
La Inmaculada, located in Los Ángeles avenue N° 328 in the locality of California.
Santa Edelmira, primary and secondary school located in Las Orquídeas street number 371 in the locality of the same name in the intersection with Huamán avenue.
Víctor Larco, in Hipólito Unanue street number 300, in the locality of Vista Alegre.
Augusto Alva Ascurra located in Huaman avenue.
José Antonio Encinas located in Bolivia avenue number 489 in the locality of Buenos Aires.
Alfred Nobel, this school is in front the Pedestrian walk of waters in Larco avenue N° 1901, in the locality of Santa Edelmira.
Cristiano Elliot, in Larco avenue N° 968 locality of San Andrés.
Integridad, in a corner formed by Rubén Darío and John Kennedy streets in the locality of Vista Alegre.
Jesús de Nazareth in Larco avenue N° 891 locality of San Andrés V.
Los Sauces, located in the sector called Los Sauces.
Max Ludwing Planck, located in Las Moreras street number 460-468, locality of California.
Nuestra Señora de Fátima, in Los Tilos street N° 149, locality of California.
San José Obrero, located in Los Claveles street N° 112, locality of California.
San Silvestre, in Ayacucho street N° 441, locality of Vista Alegre.
Tercer Milenio, in Huaman avenue N° 186, locality of Vista Alegre.
Víctor Raúl Haya de la Torre, located in Miguel Grau street N° 613, locality of Buenos Aires Norte.
Andrés Avelino Cáceres in Simón Bolívar street N° 300, locality of  Vista Alegre.
Interamericano, in Los Laureles street N° 279, locality of California.

Government

Local government
The city is governed by the Municipality of Victor Larco, which is governed by the provisions of the organic law of municipalities, it has jurisdiction throughout the district and the city, in that sense, the municipality of the district   have jurisdiction in matters relating to their own district.

Political system

The city is governed by a distrital mayor elected by popular vote every four years. The mayor is responsible for the municipal public administration and community, He is the political representative of the municipality of the city and has political directives at the distrital level, so the guidelines of their policies are aimed primarily at the territorial level.

Economy
Victor Larco district according to study published by INEI in the year 2009,  there were 146 companies in the manufacturing sector which accounted for 2.9 percent in that year of the total of the province of Trujillo.

Principal brands

1. UCV, it is the principal mark of the largest consortium of universities constituted by the Cesar Vallejo University, "Lord of Sipan University" and "Autónoma University of Peru," the first of which has its headquarters in the Victor Larco Herrera District in Trujillo city. It was founded by engineer César Acuña Peralta in 1991. Today this brand has six branches in the country and is projected to internationalization in Miami city. This brand also has several teams of volleyball and soccer, the main one is Club Deportivo Universidad César Vallejo, who in 2012 participates in the tournament of Peruvian first division.

2. UCV Satelital, is a television channel that Broadcasts its signal from Victor Larco district and some of its programs are seen in other cities through their respective subsidiaries. This TV station is located in block 17 of Avenida Larco in front of Cesar Vallejo University

Tourism

Some attractions are:
Santiago de Huamán Church, is located in Main Square of the town.
Huaman Main Square, in this place it is celebrated the festival of Patron Lord of Huaman, and also beauty contests.
Buenos Aires beach
Larco avenue
Paseo de Aguas
Association of Breeders and Owners of Paso Horses in La Libertad
Victor Larco Main Square
Vista Alegre Main Square
Peruvian paso Wall
California park

Festivals and events

Patron Lord of Huaman
The origin of this tradition dates back more than 300 years. It is a religious festival that attracts the interest of pilgrims and tourists who visit the historic temple of Santiago de Huaman. The celebration of the festival takes place from 13 to 27 May in honor of the Lord of Huaman; are made novenas, rosary and confessions offered by his faithful devotees. The celebrations also include morning and afternoon sports. Ie the main day are performed special celebrations, flag hoisting, solemn festive mass which is chaired by the Archbishop of Trujillo, also a procession of the sacred image and input to his parish with typical band of musicians. According to tradition, a fishermen went to the beach totorales old known as Playa Vieja and now as "La Bocana" and found three chests that drew heavily to shore. In one of the chests were discovered clothes, in the second and third holy image of the Lord in parts. They moved around the town where armed and wore the sacred image. One of the seamen waking Huaman said Lord, save us! and named him. The Bishop of Trujillo when knew the finding ordered to build a chapel at the site of the discovery but appeared destroyed. He was returned to redo beyond and also was destroyed, then the native fishermen decided to build the church in the village of Huaman.
Patron Lord of the Sea is celebrated in June days after Lord of Huaman Festival.
Víctor Larco anniversary, in January.
Saint Judas Tadeo feast in  October 7.
Santa Rosa, from 19 to 30 month of August in Buenos Aires.
Lord of miracles, October 18, in Vista Alegre.
Festival of sweets and flavors month of July in Paseo de Aguas.

Towns

In Victor Larco Herrera district there are the following towns:

 California
 Las Hortencias de California
 San José de California
 Santa Edelmira
 Fátima
 Vista Alegre
 San Pedro
 San Andres V Etapa
 El Golf
 Huamán
 Las Palmeras del Golf
 Las Flores del Golf
 Los Jardines del Golf
 Las Palmas
 Buenos Aires
 Los Sauces
 Las Flores
 Liberación Social
 Magisterial El Golf
 La Encalada
 Villa Florencia
 La Bocana, known in old times as Playa Vieja near where Moche river comes into the Pacific Ocean, this place is the origin of the traditional Lord of Huaman.

Security of citizenship
As in other areas of  Trujillo city, the safety of the people of Victor Larco is the responsibility of the National Police, which operates mainly in the district from the police station in Buenos Aires. They are joined by the work of the staff of public safety called serenazgo which is a municipal public security surveillance of the City of Victor Larco and also are important the offices of the judiciary installed in the district.

For greater security to the citizens Víctor Larco has installed in its jurisdiction sophisticated video surveillance cameras in strategic locations in the district that record events that occur in their coverage angles in areas where these cameras have been installed.

Health
The main health centers for people of the city are:
Health Center Victor Larco, located in the 4th block of Tacna street in the sector Buenos Aires.
Hospital  Vista Alegre, located in the main square of Vista Alegre.
ESSALUD Polyclinic, located on Larco avenue, caters to persons covered by health insurance system ESSALUD.

Notable natives and residents
Víctor Felipe Calderón Valeriano
He is also known as Victor  "El Chino Calderón", is a master of marinera dance in Victor Larco and Trujillo city. He has over 42 years devoted entirely to the cultivation of this dance and he is teaching people from different parts of the region and country the living culture of Trujillo city. In Buenos Aires North is located his Cultural Centre of Marinera which is an academy of dance where Victor Calderon still teaches dancing pupils from different parts of the country.
Carlos Enrique Vásquez Llamo
He is a politician who represents to the political group Alliance for Progress, He was chosen by popular election in 2006 as mayor of Victor Larco for 2007-2010 and in October 2010 he was elected a second time as mayor to govern the district a consecutive period for the year 2011 - 2014.
Róger David Torres Mendoza
He was born on January 26 of 1962 in the resort of Buenos Aires and in January 2012 was appointed by the Ministry of Interior of the Peruvian government as head of the Direction Territorial of Police of La Libertad (DIRTEPOL) based in the city of Trujillo. In 2014 after his retirement as a police officer Torres decided to be a candidate to run for mayor of the district where he was born.

See also

Trujillo
Historic Centre of Trujillo
Chan Chan
Puerto Chicama
Chimu
Pacasmayo beach
Marcahuamachuco
Wiracochapampa
Chimu
Moche
San Jose Festival
 Vista Alegre
Buenos Aires
Huanchaco
Las Delicias beach
La Libertad Region
Trujillo Province, Peru
Virú culture
Independence of Trujillo
Santiago de Huamán
Lake Conache
Marinera Festival
Trujillo Spring Festival
Wetlands of Huanchaco
Salaverry
Puerto Morín
Moche, Trujillo
Wall of Trujillo
Plaza de Armas of Trujillo

References

External links
Location of Víctor Larco city (Wikimapia)
"Huaca de la luna and Huaca del sol"
"Huacas del Sol y de la Luna Archaeological Complex", Official Website
Information on El Brujo Archaeological Complex
Chan Chan World Heritage Site, UNESCO
Chan Chan conservation project
Website about Trujillo, Reviews, Events, Business Directory

Multimedia

 
 
 
 Gallery pictures by Panoramio, Includes Geographical information by various authors
Colonial Trujillo photos
Hymn to Víctor Larco (audio)

Cities in La Libertad Region
Localities of Trujillo, Peru